The boys' 500 metres speed skating competition of the 2020 Winter Youth Olympics was held at Lake St. Moritz on 12 January 2020.

Results
The races were held at 12:30.

References 

Boys' 500m